was the 7th daimyō of Mutsuura Domain in southern Musashi Province, Honshū, Japan (modern-day Kanazawa-ku, Yokohama, Kanagawa Prefecture) and 10th head of the Yonekura clan. His courtesy title was Tango-no-kami.

Biography
Yonekura Masanaga was born as the 3rd son of Kutsuki Masatsuna, daimyō of Fukuchiyama Domain in Tango Province. In 1812, on the death of the 6th daimyō of Mutsuura Domain (Yonekura Masanori), he was adopted into the Yonekura clan. In June 1812, he was presented before shōgun Tokugawa Ienari and confirmed as the daimyō of Mutsuura.

As daimyō, Yonekura Masanaga was assigned to several ceremonial postings as guard of various gates to Edo Castle. On June 24, 1860, he turned his titles over to his 6th son, Yonekura Masakoto, and went into retirement. He died three years later on May 7, 1863, at the age of 71.

His grave is at the temple of Hase-dera in Shibuya, Tokyo.

Masanaga had six sons and two daughters his official wife, a daughter of Manabe Akihiro, daimyō of Sabae Domain, as well as 2 sons and 2 daughters through a concubine, the daughter of Itakura Katsunaga, daimyō of Fukushima Domain in Mutsu Province

See also
Yonekura clan

References 
 "Mutsuura-han" on Edo 300 HTML (17 February 2008)
 The content of much of this article was derived from that of the corresponding article on Japanese Wikipedia.

Fudai daimyo
1793 births
Masanaga
1863 deaths
People from Yokohama